The 2021 Constellation Cup, also known as the Cadbury Netball Series, was the 11th Constellation Cup series between New Zealand and Australia. The series featured four netball test matches, played in March 2021. Because of the COVID-19 pandemic, all four matches were hosted at the Christchurch Arena and only the final match was played with spectators in attendance. The series was won by New Zealand, who defeated Australia by three games to one, winning the  Constellation Cup for the second time and for the first time since 2012.

Squads

Australia

Notes
  Caitlin Bassett captained Australia for the first test on 2 March. Liz Watson captained Australia for the last three. 
  Maddy Proud and Paige Hadley were included in squad but did not play any in any of the tests.

New Zealand

Match officials
Because of the COVID-19 pandemic, Australia and New Zealand umpires took charge of the series. In 2020, the International Netball Federation introduced an interim policy to allow umpires to be appointed to games involving their own country, if it was too impractical to get umpires in from overseas.

Umpires

Umpire Appointments Panel

Matches

First test

Second test

Third test

Fourth test

References

2021
2021 in New Zealand netball
2021 in Australian netball
March 2021 sports events in New Zealand
International netball competitions hosted by New Zealand